KJSL may refer to:

 KJSL-LP, a low-power radio station (106.7 FM) licensed to serve Fort Smith, Arkansas, United States
 KYFI, a radio station (630 AM) licensed to serve St. Louis, Missouri, United States, which held the call sign KJSL from 1994 to 2013